Triammonium citrate is a chemical compound whose molecular formula is C6H17N3O7.

Synopsis
It was patented some date prior to 1986.

This substance causes serious eye irritation, causes skin irritation and may cause respiratory irritation.

It is known in the European E number food additive series as E380. It is known in the United States as "an indirect food additive for use only as a component of adhesives", and as a "substance added directly to human food affirmed as generally recognized as safe (GRAS)."

References

E-number additives
Food additives
Ammonium compounds
Citrates